BE&K, Inc., based in Birmingham, Alabama, is a global engineering and construction company. BE&K is named after its founders Peter Bolvig, William Edmonds, and Ted Kennedy and was founded in 1972 after the three men left the Birmingham-based Rust International to start their own company.

Background
The company originally was focused on engineering and construction for the pulp and paper industry. Today BE&K has offices throughout the US and in Europe through BE&K International. 

BE&K's Family of Companies includes Saginaw, SW&B Construction Corporation, As-Built Services, QBEK, The BE&K Building Group, BE&K Government Group, BE&K International, Rintekno, Allstates Technical Services and NorthStar Communications Group.

Acquisition
On May 7, 2008 the company announced that it would be acquired by the Houston, Texas-based  construction firm KBR, Inc. for $550 million. The company plans to remain headquartered in Birmingham.

References

External links
Official Website
Home Remodeling
Kitchen Renovations

Companies based in Birmingham, Alabama
Engineering companies of the United States
Construction and civil engineering companies of the United States